The Light Welterweight class in the 1st AIBA African Olympic Boxing Qualifying Tournament competition was the lightest class.  Light Welterweights were limited to those boxers weighing between 60 - 64 kilograms.

List of boxers

Medalists

Results

Preliminary round

Quarterfinal round

Semifinal round

3rd place Round

Final round

Qualification to Olympic games

References
AIBA

AIBA African 2008 Olympic Qualifying Tournament